The East Buttes are made up of several extinct volcanoes in and around Gresham, Oregon, United States, which are part of the Boring Lava Field.  The Boring Lava Field became active at least 2.7 million years ago, and has been extinct for about 300,000 years.

The buttes stretch from southeast Portland into Damascus.  Included are Gresham Butte (also known as Walter's Hill), Gabbert Hill, and Towle Butte.

The Gresham Butte Saddle Trail runs through open space owned by Metro and the City of Gresham.  The trail was previously a logging road and is bordered on the north by Gresham Butte and on the south by Towle Butte and Gabbert Hill.
Several tributaries of Johnson Creek are located in this open space.  The land in this area is dominated by black cottonwood, red alder, and Douglas-fir.  There are also many non-native species present, such as Himalayan blackberry and European holly, a large stand of which is found around the middle of Saddle Trail. Somewhere in the forest is an old bus used to move water pipes for the planned Mount Hood Freeway.  The project and the bus were abandoned in the 1970s after a mass public outcry against the proposed freeway.

Much of the land on Gabbert Hill was previously designated for a subdivision called Darby Ridge, but was acquired by Metro and the City of Gresham in 2007.

References

External links
 
 

Gresham, Oregon
Volcanoes of Oregon
Mountains of Oregon
Nature reserves in Oregon
Volcanoes of Multnomah County, Oregon
Protected areas of Multnomah County, Oregon
Buttes of Oregon
Landforms of Multnomah County, Oregon